The 2023 Mid-American Conference men's basketball tournament was the postseason men's basketball tournament for the Mid-American Conference (MAC) held March 9–11, 2023. The entire tournament was played at Rocket Mortgage FieldHouse in Cleveland, Ohio. Kent State defeated Toledo in the final to earn the conference's automatic bid to the 2023 NCAA tournament. Sincere Carry was the MVP.

Format
As with the 2021, and 2022 tournament, only the top eight teams qualified. The winner of the tournament received the MAC's automatic bid to the 2023 NCAA tournament.

Venue
The 2023 MAC tournament was held at Rocket Mortgage FieldHouse for the 24th consecutive season. The venue, located in downtown Cleveland at One Center Court, is the home of the Cleveland Cavaliers of the National Basketball Association (NBA) and has a seating capacity for basketball of 19,432.

Seeds
Eight out of the 12 MAC teams qualified for the tournament. Teams were seeded by record within the conference, with a tiebreaker system to seed teams with identical conference records.

Schedule

Source

Bracket

All-Tournament Team
Tournament MVP – Sincere Carry

Source

See also
2023 MAC women's basketball tournament

References

External links

2023
Tournament
Basketball competitions in Cleveland
MAC men's basketball tournament
MAC men's basketball tournament
College basketball tournaments in Ohio
2020s in Cleveland